Thivolleo is a genus of moths of the family Crambidae.

Species
Thivolleo albicervix Maes, 2006
Thivolleo meruensis Maes, 2006
Thivolleo rubritactalis (Hampson, 1918)
Thivolleo xanthographa (Hampson, 1913)

References

Pyraustinae
Crambidae genera